Chaudhary Tayyab Husain (September 7, 1936 –  October 7, 2008) was an Indian politician from Mewat, Gurgaon.

Political career 
Chaudhary Tayyab Husain was a career politician with deep ties to the Indian National Congress.  He was a prominent political figure in Indian politics, even in the early years of his career. In 1962, he was elected to the Punjab Legislative Assembly, and became the youngest minister in Sardar Partap Singh Kairon's government at age 26. He remained a member of the Punjab, Haryana, and Rajasthan legislative assemblies for some time, and became Minister in the three states. He was a Member of Parliament, Lok Sabha for two terms, as well as the Gurgaon (Lok Sabha constituency) in 1971, and the Faridabad (Lok Sabha constituency) in 1980.

Education 
After graduating in law from Aligarh Muslim University, Aligarh, Husain served twice as the General Secretary of Aligarh Muslim University Old Boys Association, and was a founding member of the India Islamic Cultural Center at New Delhi.

Family-related achievements 
Husain’s father, Yasin Khan, died in 1970. Approximately one hundred thousand people assembled at Nuh to pay homage. There, they bestowed the "Pagri of Chaudhar" on Husain, who then became the Chaudhary (Social Head) of Mewat region, and representative of the Meo community worldwide. He has two son, Ch. Zakir Hussain (MLA Nuh) and Ch. Fazal Hussain who contest from Tijara (Rajasthan) seat. He also have a daughter Zayda Khan (MLA Kaman).

Later life and death 
Husain remained president of All India Mewati Panchayat, the Mewat Education Board and Governing Body, and the Yasin Meo Degree College until his death.

Husain died in Gurgaon, Haryana on 7 October 2008.

References 

Indian National Congress politicians from Haryana
2008 deaths
1936 births
Aligarh Muslim University alumni
People from Mewat